Tep Phan is the former foreign minister and minister of the interior of Cambodia.

References

Living people
Year of birth missing (living people)
Cambodian politicians
Foreign ministers of Cambodia
Interior ministers of Cambodia